The 2012–13 Plunket Shield season was the 84th season of official first-class domestic cricket in New Zealand. The season started on 27 October 2012 and ran to 23 February 2013. Central Districts won the tournament.

Teams 
 Auckland
 Northern Districts
 Wellington
 Central Districts
 Canterbury
 Otago

Grounds

Points Distribution 

Batting Bonus Points are awarded in relation to the number of runs scored after 110 overs are bowled in the first innings.

Bowling Bonus Points are awarded in relation to the number of wickets taken after 110 overs are bowled in the first innings.

Points Table

Results

Statistics

Most Runs

Most Wickets

High Scores

Best Bowling

See also 
 Plunket Shield
 2012–13 Ford Trophy
 2012–13 HRV Cup

References 
1. https://web.archive.org/web/20121024125544/http://www.blackcaps.co.nz/_upload/series-schedules/NZC-Plunket-Shield-2012-13-updated-6SEP12.pdf 2. https://web.archive.org/web/20121024125420/http://www.blackcaps.co.nz/schedule/plunket-shield/139/series.aspx

2. http://www.espncricinfo.com/new-zealand-domestic-2012/content/series/577195.html

Plunket Shield
Plunket Shield season
2012–13 New Zealand cricket season